William Winter (24 April 1843 – 22 August 1905) was an English first-class cricketer active 1873 who played for Middlesex in a single match. He was born in Clapham and died in Rosenlaui, Switzerland. His son, Cecil, was also a first-class cricketer.

References

1843 births
1905 deaths
English cricketers
Middlesex cricketers